Wanted Dead or Alive is an American Western television series starring Steve McQueen as bounty hunter Josh Randall. It aired on CBS for three seasons in 1958–1961. The black-and-white program was a spin-off of a March 1958 episode of Trackdown, a 1957–1959 western series starring Robert Culp. Both series were produced by Vincent Fennelly for Four Star Television in association with CBS.

The series made McQueen a television star. He would later cross over into comparable status on the big screen, making him the first TV star to do so.

Series overview

Episodes

Season 1 (1958–59)

Season 2 (1959–60)

Season 3 (1960–61)

References

External links

Wanted Dead or Alive
Wanted Dead or Alive